Kirie can refer to:

 Kirie (art) (also kiri-e; Japanese: 切り絵), the Japanese art of papercutting
 Kirigami (also kirigami; Japanese: 切り紙), a variation of origami which includes papercutting
 Kirie Himuro (Japanese: 氷室 霧絵), a character from the Fatal Frame video game series
 Kirie, a magic system in the role-playing game Deep Labyrinth

See also
Kyrie (disambiguation)